Herbertville, earlier known as Wainui after the Wainui River, is a small settlement on the eastern coast of the Tararua District.  It lies just south of Cape Turnagain, a promontory named by Captain Cook who used the location as a well-remembered point where he turned his ship and retraced his journey.

At the turn of the 20th century Herbertville was a thriving community.   It had a large hotel, several shops, a police station, and a blacksmith.  Schooners beached on the vast expanse of shallow sandy beach on high tides and passengers and cargoes were unloaded.  The ships would then be refloated on the next high tide and would carry on their way.  Horse-drawn coaches connected the settlement with the township of Dannevirke via Weber.

References

Tararua District
Populated places in Manawatū-Whanganui